Maʼa is a Bantu language of Tanzania. 

The Mbugu people speak two divergent registers, which have been treated as separate languages by some authorities (e.g. Tucker and Bryan): Mbugu or "Normal Mbugu" (autonym kiMbugu) is purely Bantu, with vocabulary closely related to Pare, while Maʼa or "Inner Mbugu" (autonym kiMaʼa) consists of an inherited Cushitic vocabulary with Bantu morphology similar to that of Shambala and Pare. They share a grammar, to the point that their syntax is identical and a passage in one can be translated to the other simply by changing the content words.

The Cushitic element was identified as South Cushitic by Ehret. However, Kießling (2001) notes a large East Cushitic admixture. Mous presents the Cushitic element as a register of a Bantu language, and identifies it as largely East Cushitic rather than South Cushitic.

Phonology

Consonants 
Normal Mbugu distinguishes 29 consonants. Inner Mbugu distinguishes an additional four: /ʔ ɬ x ŋ̊x/, for a total of 33. The table below displays the consonants of Mbugu in IPA format, along with Mous' (1995) practical orthography in angle brackets where it differs from IPA.

Vowels 
Both registers of Mbugu distinguish five vowels.

Tone 
Three tones are distinguished in Mbugu: high, low, and falling. Low tone is default (unmarked). High tone is represented with an acute accent , while falling tone is represented with the sequence .

References

Further reading
Tosco, Mauro. 2000. 'Cushitic Overview.' Journal of Ethiopian Studies 33(2):87-121.

Mixed languages
East Cushitic languages
Northeast Coast Bantu languages